Scott Harding may refer to:

Scott Harding (footballer), Australian rules footballer
Scott Harding (musician), Canadian hip-hop and jazz musician/producer